Martin Emmrich and Andreas Siljeström became the first champions of this tournament, by defeating Dominic Inglot and Rylan Rizza 6–4, 3–6, [11–9] in the final.

Seeds

Draw

Draw

References
 Doubles Draw
 Qualifying Doubles Draw

Virginia National Bank Men's Pro Championship - Doubles
2009 Doubles